The 2017 North Ayrshire Council election took place on 4 May 2017 to elect members of North Ayrshire Council. The election used the ten wards created as a result of the 2015–16 boundary review, with each ward electing three or four Councillors using the single transferable vote system a form of proportional representation, with 33 Councillors being elected.

After the election, the Labour Party took control of the authority as a minority administration with outgoing council Leader Joe Cullinane being reappointed.

Election result

Note: "Votes" are the first preference votes. The net gain/loss and percentage changes relate to the result of the previous Scottish local elections on 3 May 2007. There were three more seats in this election than the previous and, as a result, this may differ from other published sources showing gain/loss relative to seats held at dissolution of Scotland's councils.

Ward results

Irvine West
2012: 2xLab; 2xSNP
2017: 2xLab; 1xSNP; 1xCon
2012–2017: Con gain one seat from SNP

Irvine East
2012: 2xSNP; 2xLab
2017: 1xSNP; 1xLab; 1xCon
2012–2017 Change: Con gain one seat; SNP lose one seat; Lab lose one seat; Ward returns one fewer member

Kilwinning
2012: 2xLab; 1xSNP; 1xIndependent
2017: 2xLab; 1xSNP; 1xCon
2012–2017 Change: Con gain one seat from Independent

Stevenston
2012: 2xLab; 1xSNP; 1xIndependent
2017: 2xLab; 1xSNP
2012–2017 Change: Independent lose one seat; Ward returns one fewer member

Ardrossan and Arran
2012: 2xSNP; 1xIndependent; 1xLab
2017: 2xSNP; 1xCon
2012–2017 Change: Con gain one seat; Independent lose one seat; Lab lose one seat; Ward returns one less member

Dalry and West Kilbride
2012: 2xIndependent; 1xSNP
2017: 1xIndependent; 1xSNP; 1xCon
2012–2017 Change: Con gain one seat from Independent

Kilbirnie and Beith
2012: 1xSNP; 1xIndependent; 1xLab
2017: 1xSNP; 1xIndependent; 1xLab
2012–2017 Change: No change

North Coast and Cumbraes
2012: 2xSNP; 1xLab; 1xCon
2017: 1xSNP; 1xLab; 1xCon; 1xIndependent
2012–2017 Change: Independent gain one seat from SNP

Saltcoats
2017: 1xSNP; 1xIndependent; 1xLab
New ward

Irvine South
2017: 1xLab; 1xSNP; 1xCon
New ward

Changes since 2017 election
†Dalry and West Kilbride SNP Cllr Joy Brahim resigned her seat on 14 May 2021 due to illness. A by-election was held on 12 August to fill the vacancy and was gained by the Conservative's Ronnie Stalker.
††Ardrossan and Arran SNP Cllr Ellen McMaster resigned from the SNP and joined the ALBA Party after its launch.

By-elections since 2017

References 

2017
2017 Scottish local elections